The 1993 British League Division Two season was contested as the second division of Speedway in the United Kingdom.

Summary
The title was won by the Glasgow Tigers.

Final table

British League Division Two Knockout Cup
The 1993 British League Division Two Knockout Cup was the 26th edition of the Knockout Cup for tier two teams. Glasgow Tigers were the winners of the competition.

First round

Quarter-finals

Semi-finals

Final
First leg

Second leg

Glasgow were declared Knockout Cup Champions, winning on aggregate 118–98.

Final leading averages

Riders & final averages
Edinburgh

Michael Coles 8.57
Kenny McKinna 8.25
Les Collins 8.12
Vesa Ylinen 7.43
Scott Lamb 6.96
Kevin Little 6.29
Sean Courtney 5.77
Peter Scully 5.68
Mike Lewthwaite 5.33
Stewart McDonald 3.53

Exeter

Richard Green 7.97
Gordon Kennett 6.93
Paul Fry 6.88
Mark Simmonds 6.01
Scott Pegler 5.57
Tommy Palmer 5.52
Frank Smart 4.91
David Steen 4.76
Václav Verner 4.59
Ian Humphreys 2.73
Graeme Gordon 1.22

Glasgow

Robert Nagy 10.18
Shane Bowes 8.99
Nigel Crabtree 8.12
David Walsh 7.75
Mick Powell 7.43
James Grieves 6.72
Jesper Olsen 6.29
David Nagel 4.43

Long Eaton

Jan Stæchmann 10.16
Neil Collins 9.60
Carl Blackbird 8.08
Martin Dixon 7.79 
David Blackburn 7.51
Richard Hellsen 7.15
Mike Hampson 5.68
Steve Johnston 5.64
Nigel Sparshott 4.58
Ade Hoole 4.52
Ian Barney 1.70

Middlesbrough
 
Steve Regeling 7.75 
Brett Saunders 7.60
Darren Sumner 7.44
Mike Smith 6.53
Paul Pickering 6.46 
Mark Courtney 6.23
Wayne Carter 6.15
Duncan Chapman 4.95
Chris Readshaw 4.07
Stuart Swales 3.38

Newcastle

Paul Thorp 9.90 
Mark Thorpe 9.28
Garry Stead 7.17 
Richard Juul 5.62
Scott Robson 5.58
Stuart Parnaby 5.24
Phil Jeffrey 4.67
Stuart Robson 4.35
Andre Compton 1.10

Oxford

Tony Langdon 8.99
Alan Grahame 7.05
David Smart 6.97
Andy Meredith 6.35
Spencer Timmo 5.66
Rene Madsen 5.53
Mark Blackbird 5.33
David Clarke 4.87
Chris Cobby 4.55
Andy Hackett .4.41
Paul Blackbird 4.29
Gary Sweet 3.30

Peterborough

Mick Poole 8.90
Alan Mogridge 7.29
Eric Monaghan 7.29
Paul Hurry 7.04
Rod Colquhoun 6.84
Hans Clausen 6.72
Ronni Pedersen 6.56
Jason Gage 6.51
Kieran McCullagh 5.44
Scott Kirton 4.94

Rye House

Martin Goodwin 8.23
Jens Rasmussen 8.04
Jan Pedersen 7.33
Lawrence Hare 7.11
Darren Spicer 6.93
Mikael Teurnberg 6.30
Trevor O'Brien 5.31
Paul Whittaker 5.05
Martin Cobbin 4.43
Chris Young 3.06

Sheffield

Roman Matousek 8.58 
Peter Carr 8.57
Chris Morton 6.66
Louis Carr 5.91
David Blackburn 5.86
Rene Aas 5.66
Rob Woffinden 5.06
Glyn Taylor 4.95
Steve Knott 4.93
Dean Child 3.72
Steve Cope 2.80
Will Beveridge 2.28

Swindon

Jason Crump 10.50
Gary Allan 8.93
Alun Rossiter 7.40
Gary Chessell 6.60
Nigel Leaver 6.16
Glenn Cunningham 6.01
Steve Camden 4.72
Steve Masters 3.56
Andy Mountain 2.67
Martin Willis 2.40

See also
List of United Kingdom Speedway League Champions
Knockout Cup (speedway)

References

Speedway British League Division Two / National League